Proudlock may refer to:

People

Adam Proudlock, footballer
Ethel Proudlock, murderer
Oliver Proudlock, cast member of Made in Chelsea
 Roger Proudlock (1920–2003), a British film producer

Other

Proudlock House and Home, a shop in Alnwick, UK